Mohamad Zamri Baba is a Grand Prix motorcycle racer from Malaysia. He races in the Asia Road Race Championship in the SS600 class for MuSASHi Boon Siew Honda Racing.

In June 2015, Zamri was in a coma after he was hit by another rider after crashing onto the gravel bed during Race 1 of the SuperSports 600cc event, a second round of the FIM Asia Road Racing Championship.

In October 2015, four months after the accident, Zamri regained awareness from coma and made a visit with family during Round 8 of the 2015 Petronas AAM Malaysian Cub Prix Championship at the Malaysia Agro Exhibition Park (MAEPS) in Serdang, Selangor.

Career statistics

By season

Races by year

References

Malaysian motorcycle racers
Living people
1983 births
Moto2 World Championship riders
People from Negeri Sembilan